Storåsfestivalen is a three-day (First year only two-day) annual music festival. It's held in the village of Storås in the municipality of Orkland, in Trøndelag county, Norway.

One of the festivals main goals is to portrait and celebrate the meeting of local and urban culture.

Music festivals in Norway
Orkland